Mallareddygudem mandal is one of the 23 mandals in Suryapet district of the Indian state of Telangana. It is under the administration of Kodad revenue division with its headquarters at Chintalapalem. It is bounded by Mattampally mandal towards west, Mellachervu mandal towards North, Krishna district of Andhra Pradesh towards East. and it is near to pulichinthala project

Demographics
Mallareddygudem mandal is having a population of 36,542 . Reballe is the smallest Village and Dondapadu is the biggest Village in the mandal.and in malla reddy gudem there is so special that is one some of the villagers fought for freedom from this village and it is near to andhra pradesh this village is very special about commreades it is near to pulichintala project and that also is in half part in Telangana and half of the part in andhrapradesh there are so many cast of people in this village ameersab is developing this village very much

Villages 
 census of India, the mandal has 10 settlements.
The settlements in the mandal are listed below:

Notes
(†) Mandal headquarter

References

Mandals in Suryapet district